Santiago Lopo, born in Vigo in 1974, is a Galician writer, teacher and translator.

Biography
He currently works as a French teacher at the Escola Oficial de Idiomas of Pontevedra. He began his professional career translating film scripts in English for TV. Since 2000 he has been a contributing writer for the magazine Unión Libre, where he has published several articles and translations.

Bibliography in Galician

Novels
Game over, 2007, Biblos Clube de Lectores.
Peaxes, 2009, Xerais.
Hora zulú, 2012, Editorial Galaxia.
A Diagonal dos Tolos, 2014, Editorial Galaxia.
A arte de trobar, 2017, Xerais.
A carteira, 2021, Xerais.

Short stories
Sorrí, Nené, sorrí!, 2014, in Grial: revista galega de cultura, No. 202.
A voz das nereidas, 2016, Editorial Elvira.
Siméon de la Manche, 2018, in Contra o vento. 30 anos do Premio Manuel García Barros, Editorial Galaxia.
Nómades, 2021, in O libro da música, Editorial Galaxia.

Translations
O meu criado e mais eu. Citomegalovirus, originally by Hervé Guibert. French-Galician translation with Xavier Queipo, 1998, Xerais.

Bibliography translated into Spanish

Novels
Hora zulú, 2015, Mar Maior.

Awards
VI Premio de Novela por Entregas de La Voz de Galicia in 2006, for Game over.
XXIV Premio García Barros in 2012, for Hora zulú.
VIII Premio Narrativa Breve Repsol in 2014, for A Diagonal dos Tolos.
Premio Xerais 2017, for A arte de trobar.
XXXVII Premio Antón Losada Diéguez in 2022, for A carteira.

External links
Portico of Galician Literature (Biography, synopsis and texts translated into English)
Hora zulú (English review in Prose and Passion)
A arte de trobar (English review in Prose and Passion)
Peaxes
Hora zulú (Spanish edition)
A Diagonal dos Tolos
Unión libre. Cadernos de vida e culturas
Interview in the newspaper Faro de Vigo (2009)
TV interview on TVG (2013)
TV interview on TVG (2014)
TV interview on TVG (2017)
TV interview on TVG (2021)

1974 births
Writers from Galicia (Spain)
Galician translators
Living people
Galician-language writers